The Carmelite Institute of Britain and Ireland (CIBI) is an initiative by the Carmelite Irish and British province and the Anglo-Irish Province of Discalced Carmelites, founded in December 2005, which provides distance learning/online courses at undergraduate and postgraduate level in Carmelite Theology. In its initial year 90 students commenced their study on the initial two programmes. On 6th October 2009 the first graduations of students enrolled in the CIBI took place in the Milltown Institute, Dublin, Ireland. From its foundation CIBI programmes were accredited by the Milltown Institute of Theology and Philosophy until its closure in 2015, subsequently the CIBI programmes have been validated by St. Patrick's College, Maynooth (Pontifical University). The BTh Carmelite Studies accredited by Maynooth was launched in 2016.

In 2012 the CIBI commenced an MA programme, which was validated by York St John University in England, since the Milltown Institute was in the process of winding down was not in a position to validate new programmes. From 2016 this became validated by Maynooth as MTh programme.

The 2021 graduation took place in St. Patrick's College, Maynooth. As well as Ireland and the UK graduates have been from Australia, Brazil, Canada, Malaysia, Norway, and the USA.

The CIBI, is based in the Carmelite Centre, Gort Mhuire, Ballinteer, Co. Dublin, Ireland. From 1949, Gort Mhuire was the novitiate for the order and the theologate for the Carmelites, in 1968 Carmelites began studying theology in Milltown Park as the Institute was being set up there. Gort Mhuire contains an extensive library (reconstituted in 2006) on Carmelite studies, theology, Spirituality and Marian studies, and much of the material is available online.

People Associated with the CIBI
Director of Studies at the CIBI, Patrick Mullins, O.Carm., former Dean of Theology at Milltown, Dr. Mullins was also a founding member of the CIBI, other founding board members of the CIBI include Johan Bergström-Allen, T.O.C., Richard Copsey, O.Carm.(former provincial of the Carmelite British Province) and Christopher O’Donnell, O.Carm.

References

Catholic universities and colleges in the Republic of Ireland
Education in Dublin (city)
Universities and colleges in the Republic of Ireland
Distance education institutions based in the Republic of Ireland
Carmelite educational institutions
Discalced Carmelite Order